Brzeziny  is a village in the administrative district of Gmina Stężyca, within Ryki County, Lublin Voivodeship, in eastern Poland.

The village has a population of 460.

References

Brzeziny